In military terminology, a stomach division is a unit created for the purpose of containing combatants of disuse  in the front lines. Its name originates from its original conception, in which men suffering from stomach illnesses were moved to a single division to avoid spreading disease further. The German 70th Infantry Division of World War II was an example.

Usage
During the Battle of the Bulge, the German soldiers suffering from illnesses not deemed severe enough to prevent them from fighting were placed in such a division. To keep them well enough to fight, they were fed on a specialised diet and were allowed their own latrines to avoid spreading their illnesses.

Lieutenant General Brian Horrocks of XXX Corps used this term in an interview for the documentary series "The World at War", where he described a unit of sick troops being amongst the only German forces protecting the Rhine in Belgium.

Sources

Military terminology